Alexander Robin Keath (born 20 January 1992) is an Australian rules footballer who plays for the Western Bulldogs in the Australian Football League. He formerly played professional cricket for Victoria in Australian domestic cricket.

Early life
Born in Shepparton in northern Victoria, Keath completed his schooling at Goulburn Valley Grammar School and Melbourne Grammar School. He was a talented junior in both football and cricket, and drew the attention of professional recruiters from both sports. In 2009, after excelling at under-18s football for the Murray Bushrangers in the TAC Cup, he was recruited by the newly established Gold Coast Suns football club, which at that time was recruiting twelve 17-year-olds in a separate draft before it entered the Australian Football League in 2011. At the same time, Keath had excelled as a junior cricketer, and represented Australia in their successful 2010 Under-19 Cricket World Cup, and was offered a three-year Cricket Victoria contract.

Cricket career
In April 2010, Keath chose to proceed with cricket, accepting his Cricket Victoria contract. An all rounder who bowled medium pace, Keath made his first-class cricket debut against the touring England team in December 2010 making 46. Over the following five years, he failed to earn a regular spot in the Victorian team, playing a total of seven first-class matches and sixteen List A matches, averaging less than twenty with the bat in both formats, as well as five Twenty20 matches for the Melbourne Stars. He played premier cricket for Melbourne during that time, scoring 2101 runs at 35.01 and taking 79 wickets at 19.62.

At the end of the 2014–15 season, Keath lost his Cricket Victoria contract. He spent the 2015 season playing in England in the Birmingham Premier League, and upon his return to Australia signed for South Australian Grade Cricket club Prospect. On 8 December 2015 Keath was signed by the Adelaide Strikers in the Big Bash League but was not offered a first class contract with the South Australian Cricket Association (SACA).

Football career
Despite being drafted to the Gold Coast Suns in 2009, Keath was eligible to be drafted as a Category B rookie from 2013 as he had not played for an Australian rules football club at any level for three years. His shift to South Australian grade cricket attracted the attention of football recruiters, and in October 2015 he was signed by the Adelaide Football Club as a Category B rookie. Despite being on the football club's list, cricket initially remained Keath's primary focus season, with Adelaide's recruitment of him in the hope that he would switch to football at the end of the 2015–16 summer season. After he failed to earn a SACA contract, he began playing SANFL football for the Adelaide reserves in the 2016 winter season. In 2017, Keath was named co-captain of the Adelaide Crows SANFL team.

Keath made his debut for the Adelaide Crows AFL side against the Geelong Cats  at Adelaide Oval on 21 July 2017, filling in for the injured Jake Lever and Kyle Hartigan.

At the end of the 2019 AFL season Keath officially requested a trade to the Western Bulldogs. The trade was finalised on 16 October.

References

External links

 

1992 births
Living people
Cricketers from Victoria (Australia)
People educated at Melbourne Grammar School
People from Shepparton
Australian cricketers
Victoria cricketers
Murray Bushrangers players
Melbourne Stars cricketers
Australian rules footballers from Victoria (Australia)
Melbourne Cricket Club cricketers
Adelaide Football Club (SANFL) players
Adelaide Football Club players
Western Bulldogs players